The  is a women's professional wrestling world tag team championship promoted by the CyberFight promotion, defended on their Tokyo Joshi Pro Wrestling (TJPW) brand. The title was introduced on August 12, 2017.

Like most professional wrestling championships, the title is won as a result of a scripted match. , there have been twelve reigns shared among eleven teams, eighteen wrestlers and one vacancy. 121000000 (Maki Itoh and Miyu Yamashita) are the current champions in their first reign as a team as well as individually.

History
The inaugural champions were crowned on October 14, 2017, when MiraClians (Shoko Nakajima and Yuka Sakazaki) defeated Maho Kurone and Rika Tatsumi in a tournament final.

Inaugural championship tournament

Reigns

Names

Combined reigns 

By team
{| class="wikitable sortable" style="text-align: center"
!Rank
!Team
!No. ofreigns
!Combineddefenses
!Combineddays
|-
!1
| || 2 || 11 || 560
|-
!2
| || 1 || 4 || 370
|-
!3
||| 1 || 3 || 179
|-
!4
| || 1 || 2 || 175
|-
!5
| || 1 || 2 || 161
|-
!6
| || 1 || 3 || 148
|-
!7
| || 1 || 2 || 112
|-
!8
| || 1 || 1 || 92
|-
!9
| || 1 || 2 || 89
|-
!10
||| 1 || 3 || 73
|-
!11
|style="background-color:#FFE6BD"|121000000 †|| 1 || 0 || +
|-

By wrestler

References

External links 
TJPW official site, in Japanese

Women's professional wrestling tag team championships
Tokyo Joshi Pro-Wrestling